Henry George Nicholls (1825–1867) was Perpetual curate of the church of the Holy Trinity, East Dean−, in the Forest of Dean.
 He wrote three books on the area and its history. His work includes information on such landmarks as St Briavels Castle and Speech House. His descriptions and historical information continue to be cited as authority concerning the history of the area.

Nicholls was the only son of Sir George Nicholls, K.C.B. He was educated at Rugby School and Trinity College, Cambridge, where he received a B.A. in 1845 and an M.A. in 1848. He assumed his position at the church of the Holy Trinity in 1847 and held it until he died. He was married and was survived by twin boys.

Works 
 The Forest of Dean (1858)
 The Personalities of the Forest of Dean (1863)
 Iron Making in the olden times as instanced in the ancient mines, forges and furnaces of the forest of Dean (1866)

References

External links 
 
 

1825 births
1867 deaths
19th-century English Anglican priests
19th-century English historians
Alumni of Trinity College, Cambridge
People from Forest of Dean District
English male non-fiction writers
19th-century English male writers